Ève Ruggieri (born 13 March 1939) is a French actress, producer, and author.

Publications 
L'honneur retrouvé du marquis de Montespan, Perrin, 1993 
Mozart, l'itinéraire sentimental, J'ai Lu, 1999 
Quelques femmes remarquables, Pocket, 1998 
Les grandes rencontres amoureuses, J'ai Lu, 2001 
Le rêve de Zamor, Plon, 2003 
Pavarotti, Michel Lafon, 2007 
Mozart, l'itinéraire libertin, Michel Lafon, 2007 
La Callas, Michel Lafon, 2007 
Chopin, l'impossible amour, Michel Lafon, 2010 
Liszt, l'abbé libertin, Michel Lafon, 2011 
Dictionnaire amoureux de Mozart, Plon, 2017

References

External links
https://www.imdb.com/name/nm0749454/ 

French writers

1939 births
Living people